Parigi is an Italian village and hamlet (frazione) of Felino, a municipality in the province of Parma, Emilia-Romagna. The toponym derives from the French capital city, Paris, which in Italian is Parigi. In 2009, it had a population of 21.

The village located on a side road of the provincial highway SP32, named Via Ilario Bragazzi. Composed by some farmhouses, it is close to Cinghio creek and to the villages of San Michele Tiorre, Ca' Cotti and La Resga. It is 1.6 km far from Pilastro, 1.2 from Calicella (both hamlets of Langhirano), 3 from Felino, and 17 from the city centre of Parma.

See also
San Michele Tiorre
Marsiglia (Davagna)

References

External links

Frazioni of the Province of Parma